Cut Piece 1964 is a pioneer of performance art and participatory work first performed by Yoko Ono on July 20, 1964, at the Yamaichi Concert Hall in Kyoto, Japan. It is one of the earliest and most significant works of the feminist art movement and Fluxus.

On July 20, 1964, Yoko Ono performed her most famous performance art piece for the first time at the Yamaichi Concert Hall in Kyoto, Japan A few randomly selected audience members were asked to cut her clothes with scissors into pieces until Ono was completely naked. Ono sat alone cross-legged on the stage in her best clothes, her long hair draped over her shoulders. The audience took turns walking up to her on stage and joining her performance, cutting off pieces of her clothing with scissors. Her expression was kept poised and silenced while her body remained motionless. For the final stage of the performance, her body was fully exposed. The audience walked down the steps clutching the remnants of her clothes and they were allowed to keep these pieces with them. As a pioneering work, Ono certainly places the viewer in a very important position and is an important element of Cut Piece.

Reprise 
After Ono's initial performance in Kyoto, she reprised the performance for several times later in Tokyo, New York, London and Paris. For the second version, the audience may cut each other's clothing as they wish. Later, in Ono's published book, Grapefruit 1964, she mentioned that the performer of Cut Piece may not be female. The performer is in the third person, i.e., can be any gender.

In each reinterpretation of the work, Ono created different changes. In the most recent reprise of Cut Piece - Paris 2003, Ono claimed that the purpose was for world peace. After nearly 40 years, when she reprised Cut Piece, her mindset was also very different from when she first performed it. Ono said, "Force and intimidation were in the air. People were silenced. Cut Piece is my hope for world peace. When I first performed this work, in 1964, I did it with some anger and turbulence in my heart". At the same time, she spoke on the stage: "Come and cut a piece of my clothing wherever you like - the size of less than a postcard - and send it to the one you love".

Discussion and explanation 
Cut Piece caused a sensation and inspired much discussion. After its initial performance, Ono mentioned that one of the purposes of the show was to share and give a part of her best. That's why she chose to wear her best suit. In one of her early interviews, she said, "It was a form of giving, giving and taking. It was a kind of criticism against artists, who are always giving what they want to give. I wanted people to take whatever they wanted to, so it was very important to say you can cut wherever you want to ". And she also mentioned that part of her inspiration came from Buddhism.

Paradoxically, Cut Piece is a classic and universally recognized feminist work in public. In a 1994 interview, Ono denied that she had feminist ideas when she first performed it. In the performance, she invites deeper reflection than just revealing the connection between the performer (the object) and the audience. She creates her relationship with the audience by giving them the opportunity to participate in the performance as well as to gaze at the work and ponder it from their own perspective.

Dispute 
Cut Piece boldly presents violence against women's bodies in the form of cut-out clothes. Most people define this as feminist performance art. But Ono remains ambiguous about it, almost entirely giving the viewer the responsibility and right to judge the work. Performing the piece made Ono famous, yet it sparked much controversy.  Thomas E. Crow commended in 1966, "it is difficult to think of an earlier work of art that so acutely pinpoints the political question of women’s physical vulnerability as mediated by regimes of vision". However, Marcia Tanner criticized Cut Piece as "really quite gruesome—more like a rape than an art performance". She argues that the work is full of aggression and violence against women and is deliberately passive and sexually controlling. Ono is reduced to an object to be scrutinized, violated by the audience, and subjected to the male gaze. At the same time, the audience's role changes from voyeur to victimizer, sadist and aggressor, being dangerous and threatening.

References

Performances
Works by Yoko Ono
1964 in Japan
Culture in Kyoto
Performing arts in Japan
Nudity in theatre and dance
Events in Kyoto